"Home" is a song written and recorded by American group Edward Sharpe and the Magnetic Zeros. It was released in January 2010 as the second single from the album, Up from Below. The song came in at number 73 on Australian radio station Triple J's 100 hottest songs of the past 20 years.

Song
The song is a duet between Alex Ebert and Jade Castrinos, with portions of spoken word from both. It features prominent use of whistling. In total, the song has nearly three minutes of whistling, including the opening melody. Other instruments include guitar, piano, and trumpet.

Track listing

Music video
A music video for the song features a selection of clips of the band on tour in Australia. It was made by Ryan Gall, with cinematography from Gall, Petey Klein, Stephen Frizza and Hamish Siddins.

Media spotlight
 "Home" was first featured on the 1st-season episode "Debate 109" of the NBC comedy Community which aired on November 12, 2009, before the song's release as a single in January 2010.
 "Home" was featured on commercials for Blue Cross Blue Shield Association in the United States in 2011, for IKEA in the Netherlands in 2011, for HRV Home Ventilation in New Zealand in 2012 and for Peugeot in the United Kingdom and in France in 2014.
 The song features in the 2012 film What to Expect When You're Expecting.
 The song was featured on the season 6 episode of Glee titled "Homecoming".
 A string quartet version of the song performed by Vitamin String Quartet was featured on the 5th-season finale of Modern Family entitled "The Wedding".
 The song is featured in the film Stuck in Love.
 The song was featured on the Season 1 finale of Raising Hope, entitled "Don't Vote for This Episode".
 The song was also featured in Gossip Girl, Season 3 Episode 6.
 The song plays during the credits of Jesus Henry Christ.
 The song is featured in a 2016 holiday commercial for Comcast (Xfinity).
 The song was also featured in several episodes of Canal 13 TV program De Alaska a Patagonia.
 It also began to go viral on TikTok in late November 2020, according to Spotify’s “Viral Hits” playlist, along with the Edith Whiskers cover version.
 The song was featured in the Amazon Prime original television show “The Wilds.”
 The song was featured in the Netflix movie A Perfect Pairing sung by the actress Victoria Justice.
 The song was featured in the 2013 film Stuck In Love twice, at the beginning and ending of the film.

Charts

Weekly charts

Year-end charts

Certifications

References

2010 singles
2009 songs
Rough Trade Records singles
Songs written by Alex Ebert